Yeh Shih-tao (1925 – 11 December 2008) was a pioneering Taiwanese writer and historian, who specialized in the literary history of Taiwan and the lives of ordinary Taiwanese people. He was considered a seminal figure in Taiwanese literary criticism.

Yeh Shih-tao was born in Tainan, Taiwan, in 1925 at a time when Taiwan was under Japanese rule. His early writings were in Japanese, but he switched to Chinese after the Nationalists under Chiang Kai-shek gained control of Taiwan following the end of World War II. He wrote three novels while attending high school, one of which, titled A Letter from Lin (林君來的信), was published in April 1943 as Yeh's debut work. He was arrested by the Chiang Kai-shek regime in 1951 and imprisoned for three years for allegedly harboring "communist agents." After his release from prison, Yeh became a schoolteacher. In 1965, Yen published Youth (青春), which he described as his first serious work since the war ended.

Author of No Land, No Literature (沒有土地, 哪有文學), The Dilemmas of Taiwan Literature and History of Taiwanese Literature (台灣文學史綱), he chronicled 300 years of the island's literary history and gained renown "for his searing portrayals of ordinary Taiwanese". His best known work was likely The Chronicle of Taiwanese Literature, a compilation of Taiwanese historical literature published in 1987.

Yeh later served as an adviser of the Teacher Human Rights Advocate Committee in Kaohsiung, and was appointed a national policy adviser to the Chen Shui-bian government.

Yeh Shih-tao died of intestinal cancer in Kaohsiung, on 11 December 2008, at the age of 83. He had been continuously hospitalized since February 2008. Yeh was survived by his wife and two sons.

Yeh's works of fiction have been translated to a number of languages, among them English, Japanese, Korean, Malay, and Vietnamese. A documentary about the author, Yeh Shih-tao, A Taiwan Man, was released in 2022.

See also
 List of Taiwanese authors

References

External links
 The Man Who Has Put the Signs on the Road:Yeh Shih-tao
 Taking the nation's literature to the nation (Taipei Times)

1925 births
2008 deaths
20th-century Taiwanese historians
Taiwanese male novelists
Taiwanese people of Hoklo descent
Historians of Taiwan
Writers from Tainan
20th-century novelists
Deaths from cancer in Taiwan
Deaths from colorectal cancer
20th-century male writers
Senior Advisors to President Chen Shui-bian
Taiwanese prisoners and detainees
Prisoners and detainees of Taiwan
20th-century Taiwanese writers
Taiwanese schoolteachers
Literary historians
20th-century Taiwanese educators